Alsbach-Hähnlein is a municipality in southern Hesse (Germany) in the district Darmstadt-Dieburg. It resulted from a merger of the two separate municipalities (Gemeinden) Alsbach  and Hähnlein.

Sister city 
  Diósd, Hungary

References

External links 
 
Historical Association Website 

Darmstadt-Dieburg
Arras
Grand Duchy of Hesse